Neil Brand (born 12 April 1996) is a South African cricketer. He is a left-handed batsman and a left-arm orthodox bowler. He initially moved to King's College, Taunton, with a hope to qualify to play for the England cricket team, before returning to South Africa at the end of 2017.

Brand made his first-class debut for Cardiff MCCU against Glamorgan on 2 April 2015. He made his List A debut for Northerns in the 2017–18 CSA Provincial One-Day Challenge on 25 March 2018.

In September 2018, Brand was named in Northerns' squad for the 2018 Africa T20 Cup. He made his Twenty20 debut for Northerns in the 2018 Africa T20 Cup on 14 September 2018. In April 2021, he was named in Northerns' squad, ahead of the 2021–22 cricket season in South Africa.

References

External links

1996 births
Living people
South African cricketers
Cardiff MCCU cricketers
Northerns cricketers
Titans cricketers
Joburg Super Kings cricketers
People educated at King's College, Taunton